The arrondissement of Toulouse is an arrondissement of France in the Haute-Garonne department in the Occitanie region. It has 225 communes.

Composition

The communes of the arrondissement of Toulouse, and their INSEE codes, are:

 Aignes (31002)
 Aigrefeuille (31003)
 Albiac (31006)
 Aucamville (31022)
 Aureville (31025)
 Auriac-sur-Vendinelle (31026)
 Aurin (31029)
 Aussonne (31032)
 Auzeville-Tolosane (31035)
 Auzielle (31036)
 Avignonet-Lauragais (31037)
 Ayguesvives (31004)
 Azas (31038)
 Balma (31044)
 Baziège (31048)
 Bazus (31049)
 Beaupuy (31053)
 Beauteville (31054)
 Beauville (31055)
 Beauzelle (31056)
 Belberaud (31057)
 Belbèze-de-Lauragais (31058)
 Bélesta-en-Lauragais (31060)
 Bellegarde-Sainte-Marie (31061)
 Bellesserre (31062)
 Bessières (31066)
 Blagnac (31069)
 Bondigoux (31073)
 Bonrepos-Riquet (31074)
 Le Born (31077)
 Bouloc (31079)
 Bourg-Saint-Bernard (31082)
 Brax (31088)
 Bretx (31089)
 Brignemont (31090)
 Bruguières (31091)
 Le Burgaud (31093)
 Buzet-sur-Tarn (31094)
 Cabanac-Séguenville (31096)
 Le Cabanial (31097)
 Cadours (31098)
 Caignac (31099)
 Calmont (31100)
 Cambiac (31102)
 Caragoudes (31105)
 Caraman (31106)
 Castanet-Tolosan (31113)
 Castelginest (31116)
 Castelmaurou (31117)
 Castelnau-d'Estrétefonds (31118)
 Le Castéra (31120)
 Caubiac (31126)
 Cépet (31136)
 Cessales (31137)
 Clermont-le-Fort (31148)
 Colomiers (31149)
 Cornebarrieu (31150)
 Corronsac (31151)
 Cox (31156)
 Cugnaux (31157)
 Daux (31160)
 Deyme (31161)
 Donneville (31162)
 Drémil-Lafage (31163)
 Drudas (31164)
 Escalquens (31169)
 Espanès (31171)
 Le Faget (31179)
 Falga (31180)
 Fenouillet (31182)
 Flourens (31184)
 Folcarde (31185)
 Fonbeauzard (31186)
 Fourquevaux (31192)
 Francarville (31194)
 Fronton (31202)
 Gagnac-sur-Garonne (31205)
 Garac (31209)
 Gardouch (31210)
 Gargas (31211)
 Garidech (31212)
 Gauré (31215)
 Gémil (31216)
 Gibel (31220)
 Goyrans (31227)
 Gragnague (31228)
 Gratentour (31230)
 Grenade (31232)
 Le Grès (31234)
 Issus (31240)
 Juzes (31243)
 Labastide-Beauvoir (31249)
 Labastide-Saint-Sernin (31252)
 Labège (31254)
 Lacroix-Falgarde (31259)
 Lagarde (31262)
 Lagraulet-Saint-Nicolas (31265)
 Lanta (31271)
 Lapeyrouse-Fossat (31273)
 Laréole (31275)
 Larra (31592)
 Lasserre-Pradère (31277)
 Launac (31281)
 Launaguet (31282)
 Lauzerville (31284)
 Lavalette (31285)
 Layrac-sur-Tarn (31288)
 Léguevin (31291)
 Lespinasse (31293)
 Lévignac (31297)
 Loubens-Lauragais (31304)
 Lux (31310)
 La Magdelaine-sur-Tarn (31311)
 Mascarville (31325)
 Mauremont (31328)
 Maurens (31329)
 Maureville (31331)
 Mauvaisin (31332)
 Menville (31338)
 Mérenvielle (31339)
 Mervilla (31340)
 Merville (31341)
 Mirepoix-sur-Tarn (31346)
 Mondonville (31351)
 Mondouzil (31352)
 Monestrol (31354)
 Mons (31355)
 Montaigut-sur-Save (31356)
 Montastruc-la-Conseillère (31358)
 Montberon (31364)
 Montbrun-Lauragais (31366)
 Montclar-Lauragais (31368)
 Montégut-Lauragais (31371)
 Montesquieu-Lauragais (31374)
 Montgaillard-Lauragais (31377)
 Montgeard (31380)
 Montgiscard (31381)
 Montjoire (31383)
 Montlaur (31384)
 Montpitol (31388)
 Montrabé (31389)
 Mourvilles-Basses (31392)
 Mourvilles-Hautes (31393)
 Nailloux (31396)
 Nogaret (31400)
 Noueilles (31401)
 Odars (31402)
 Ondes (31403)
 Paulhac (31407)
 Péchabou (31409)
 Pechbonnieu (31410)
 Pechbusque (31411)
 Pelleport (31413)
 Pibrac (31417)
 Pin-Balma (31418)
 Plaisance-du-Touch (31424)
 Pompertuzat (31429)
 Pouze (31437)
 Préserville (31439)
 Prunet (31441)
 Puysségur (31444)
 Quint-Fonsegrives (31445)
 Ramonville-Saint-Agne (31446)
 Rebigue (31448)
 Renneville (31450)
 Revel (31451)
 Rieumajou (31453)
 Roquesérière (31459)
 Rouffiac-Tolosan (31462)
 Roumens (31463)
 Saint-Alban (31467)
 Saint-Cézert (31473)
 Sainte-Foy-d'Aigrefeuille (31480)
 Sainte-Livrade (31496)
 Saint-Félix-Lauragais (31478)
 Saint-Geniès-Bellevue (31484)
 Saint-Germier (31485)
 Saint-Jean (31488)
 Saint-Jean-Lherm (31489)
 Saint-Jory (31490)
 Saint-Julia (31491)
 Saint-Léon (31495)
 Saint-Loup-Cammas (31497)
 Saint-Marcel-Paulel (31501)
 Saint-Orens-de-Gameville (31506)
 Saint-Paul-sur-Save (31507)
 Saint-Pierre (31511)
 Saint-Pierre-de-Lages (31512)
 Saint-Rome (31514)
 Saint-Rustice (31515)
 Saint-Sauveur (31516)
 Saint-Vincent (31519)
 La Salvetat-Lauragais (31527)
 La Salvetat-Saint-Gilles (31526)
 Saussens (31534)
 Ségreville (31540)
 Seilh (31541)
 Seyre (31546)
 Tarabel (31551)
 Thil (31553)
 Toulouse (31555)
 Tournefeuille (31557)
 Toutens (31558)
 Trébons-sur-la-Grasse (31560)
 L'Union (31561)
 Vacquiers (31563)
 Vallègue (31566)
 Vallesvilles (31567)
 Varennes (31568)
 Vaudreuille (31569)
 Vaux (31570)
 Vendine (31571)
 Verfeil (31573)
 Vieille-Toulouse (31575)
 Vieillevigne (31576)
 Vignaux (31577)
 Vigoulet-Auzil (31578)
 Villariès (31579)
 Villaudric (31581)
 Villefranche-de-Lauragais (31582)
 Villematier (31583)
 Villemur-sur-Tarn (31584)
 Villeneuve-lès-Bouloc (31587)
 Villeneuve-Tolosane (31588)
 Villenouvelle (31589)

History

The arrondissement of Toulouse was created in 1800. In January 2017 it lost the commune Auragne to the arrondissement of Muret, and it gained the commune Aignes from the arrondissement of Muret.

As a result of the reorganisation of the cantons of France which came into effect in 2015, the borders of the cantons are no longer related to the borders of the arrondissements. The cantons of the arrondissement of Toulouse were, as of January 2015:

 Blagnac
 Cadours
 Caraman
 Castanet-Tolosan
 Fronton
 Grenade
 Lanta
 Léguevin
 Montastruc-la-Conseillère
 Montgiscard
 Nailloux
 Revel
 Toulouse-1
 Toulouse-2
 Toulouse-3
 Toulouse-4
 Toulouse-5
 Toulouse-6
 Toulouse-7
 Toulouse-8
 Toulouse-9
 Toulouse-10
 Toulouse-11
 Toulouse-12
 Toulouse-13
 Toulouse-14
 Toulouse-15
 Tournefeuille
 Verfeil
 Villefranche-de-Lauragais
 Villemur-sur-Tarn

References

Toulouse